Mike Poge (born 23 January 1969) is a professional German darts player who currently playing in the Professional Darts Corporation events.

Darts Career
Poge first qualified for a PDC European Tour event in 2019, the 2019 International Darts Open, where he lost 6-3 to James Richardson in the first round.

References

External links

Living people
German darts players
Professional Darts Corporation associate players
1969 births
People from Reutlingen
Sportspeople from Tübingen (region)
20th-century German people